"I Do!!" is the debut single of American R&B singer Toya, serving as the lead single from her debut album, Toya (2001). Produced by Antoine "Bam" Macon, "I Do!!" became a hit for Toya, reaching  16 on the US Billboard Hot 100, No. 12 in Australia, and No. 9 in New Zealand. Despite the success of the single, the album failed to match the song's success, reaching number 109 on the Billboard 200. Toya released only one more single, 2002's "No Matta What (Party All Night)", before being contractually released from Arista Records.

Track listing

Charts

Weekly charts

Year-end charts

Release history

References

External links
 

2001 songs
2001 debut singles
Arista Records singles
Toya (singer) songs